Guillermo Fernando Hauche (born March 31, 1993) is an Argentine footballer who plays as a forward for Paraguayan team General Caballero Sport Club.

Life and career

Early career

Hauche was born in La Plata, in the Buenos Aires Province of Argentina. He played youth football with Lanús before joining Racing Club in 2013. He made his senior debut on March 16, 2014, replacing Luis Ibáñez after 51 minutes of a 2–0 Primera División defeat away to Newell's Old Boys. According to Olé, he tried to use his pace to unsettle the opposition, and near the end had a clean shot that went just over the bar. Hauche was involved in controversy towards the end of that season when, after Racing's local rivals Independiente won a match that took them closer to promotion to the Primera, he tweeted an insulting message about the club. He started the last two matches of the 2013–14 Primera División season, but those were his last appearances for Racing's first team.

Hauche joined Almagro of the Primera B Metropolitana on loan for the 2015 season. He made eight appearances without scoring, before being dropped from the squad. When he returned to Racing, he was restricted to reserve-team football.

In February 2017, Hauche had a trial with Aldosivi, newly relegated from the Primera División. Despite a goal in a friendly match against Estudiantes, no contract ensued. In June, he signed for Unión Española of the Chilean Primera División.

New England Revolution

On September 13, 2018, Hauche signed with the New England Revolution of Major League Soccer. Prior to joining the Revolution, Hauche had been without a club since early May, following the end of his loan stint with Deportes Temuco. At the time of his signing, the Revolution were five points out of a playoff position with six matches left in the regular season, and were looking to add attacking pieces to help with their playoff push. Revolution GM Mike Burns praised Hauche as very technical player who would provide the team with another attacking option heading into the final stretch of the season. Head coach Brad Friedel was equally complimentary of Hauche's skill set, calling him "a goal scorer and a goal creator.”

On September 22, 2018 Hauche made his league debut, deployed as a left back, at home against Chicago Fire FC as a 46th minute substitute for Brandon Bye. The Revolution would draw the match 2-2. Hauche received high praise from teammates and his coach alike in his debut, with Friedel calling him "a very, very good player in the opponent’s attacking half of the field." and adding that Hauche "knows how to unlock defenses, and we’re just going to try to get him up to match speed as quickly as possible." Teammate Andrew Farrell called Hauche a "great player on and off the field."

He would make his first start for the club the following week, this time as a right winger, at BMO Field against Toronto FC. The Revolution would lose the match 4-1. He would start again in the Revolution's 2-1 away loss to Atlanta United FC.

Hauche concluded the 2018 season with a 47.8 accurate pass percentage in 175 minutes with no goals and no assists in four scoring chances.

New England declined Hauche's contract at the end of their 2018 season.

Later career

In 2021, Hauche signed with General Caballero Sport Club in Paraguay.

References

External links
 
 

1993 births
Living people
Argentine footballers
Footballers from La Plata
Association football midfielders
Racing Club de Avellaneda footballers
Club Almagro players
Unión Española footballers
New England Revolution players
Argentine Primera División players
Primera B Metropolitana players
Expatriate footballers in Chile
Argentine expatriate footballers
Major League Soccer players
Expatriate footballers in Paraguay